Haidong (Wylie: Haitung) is a prefecture-level city of Qinghai province in Western China. Its name literally means "east of the (Qinghai) Lake." On 8 February 2013 Haidong was upgraded from a prefecture into a prefecture-level city. Haidong is the third most populous administrative division in Qinghai after Xining and Golmud.

Haidong was historically populated by the Qiang people, although the area has been inhabited as early as 6000 years ago. In 121 BC the area was captured by Huo Qubing, defeating the Xiongnu. In 399 AD the Xianbei founded the state of Nanliang, with its capital in Ledu District.

Geography 
Haidong is the easternmost division of Qinghai province. It is bounded by Xining, the provincial capital, to the West, the Datong River Valley to the north, Gansu to the east, and the Yellow River to the south. Mountain ranges tower above the district of which the main valley is the one of the Huang Shui (Tib. Tsong Chu), a major tributary of the Yellow River. This valley stretches from west to east and makes up - together with the area around Xining, the landscape which is called Tsongkha ("Onion Valley") by Tibetans. It has a total area of

Climate

Administrative divisions

Demographics 
As of 2005, the total population of Haidong is approximately 1,480,000. It is the most densely populated area of Qinghai, with almost a third of the province's population (its surface makes up only two percent of Qinghai).

Further reading 
 A. Gruschke: The Cultural Monuments of Tibet’s Outer Provinces: Amdo - Volume 1. The Qinghai Part of Amdo, White Lotus Press, Bangkok 2001. 
 Tsering Shakya: The Dragon in the Land of Snows. A History of Modern Tibet Since 1947, London 1999,

References

 
Prefecture-level divisions of Qinghai
Amdo
Cities in Qinghai